"Move That Body" is a 1991 song by Belgian dance act Technotronic, released as the first single from their second studio album, Body to Body (1991). Vocals are performed by Congolese–American singer, model, and actress Réjane Magloire, credited as Reggie. The single achieved some success throughout Europe, particularly in Denmark, Finland, Ireland and Switzerland where it was a top ten hit. In the UK, it peaked at number 12.

Critical reception
A reviewer from Music & Media commented, "Pumping up the jam again. Demanding dance beats from the Belgian specialists, ready for EHR." James Hamilton from Music Week described the song as a "girl rapped pop canterer".

Track listings
These are the major formats and track listing for the releases of "Move That Body":

 7" single
 "Move That Body" — 3:55
 "Move That Body" (instrumental) — 3:30

 12" maxi
 "Move That Body" (12" version) — 4:27
 "Move That Body" (12" instrumental) — 3:46
 "Getting Started" (instrumental) — 5:40

 CD maxi
 "Move That Body" (7" version) — 3:55
 "Move That Body" (12" version) — 4:27
 "Move That Body" (12" instrumental) — 3:46
 "Getting Started" (instrumental) — 5:40

 Cassette (double length)
 "Move That Body" — 3:55
 "Move That Body" (instrumental) — 5:40
 "Move That Body" (12" version) — 4:27

Charts

Weekly charts

Year-end charts

References

1991 singles
1991 songs
English-language Belgian songs
Mega Records singles
Songs written by Jo Bogaert
Technotronic songs